The 1969–70 season saw Rochdale compete in the Football League Third Division, following promotion the previous season.

Statistics
																												
																												

|}

Final League Table

Competitions

Football League Third Division

F.A. Cup

League Cup

Lancashire Cup

Rose Bowl

Notes

References

Rochdale A.F.C. seasons
Rochdale